The Thaksin Express is an express train run by the State Railway of Thailand (SRT) between Bangkok and Su-ngai Kolok, a border town in Narathiwat Province and the end of the southern rail line. Thaksin is a Thai word for 'south' (from the Sanskrit word dakshin), thus this train is referred to as the "Southern Express". The train's passenger cars include 1st- and 2nd-class air conditioned sleepers, 2nd-class fan sleepers, 2nd-class fan seating coaches, 3rd class air conditioned and fan seating coaches, and a dining car.

Overview
The train passes through cities and towns along the western edge of the gulf coast of southern Thailand on the upper Malay peninsula. These include Nakhon Pathom, Hua Hin, Surat Thani, Hat Yai, Yala, and Su-ngai Kolok. Although the rail line is connected to the Malaysian rail system, there is no cross-border service on this route.

Timetable 
Train Number 37 Bangkok - Su-ngai Kolok (departure times)
 Bangkok (กรุงเทพ) - 15:10
 Sam Sen (สามเสน) - 15:28 
 Bang Sue (บางซื่อ) - 15:39
 Bang Bumru (บางบำหรุ) - 15:57 
 Salaya (ศาลายา) - 16:14
 Nakhon Pathom (นครปฐม) - 16:42
 Ban Pong (บ้านโป่ง) - 17:00
 Ratchaburi (ราชบุรี) - 17:29 
 Phetburi (เพชรบุรี) - 18:15
 Hua Hin (หัวหิน) - 19:11  - three minute stop to change crews
 Wang Phong (วังก์พง) - 19:31
 Prachuap Khiri Khan (ประจวบคีรีขันธ์) - 20:28
 Bang Saphan Yai (บางสะพานใหญ่)- 21:38 
 Chumphon (ชุมพร) - 23:32 - ten minute stop for refuelling and changing crews 
 Surat Thani (สุราษฎร์ธานี) - 01:56 next day - three minute stop to change crews  
 Thung Song (ทุ่งสง) - 03:54 - 10 minute stop for refuelling 
 Phatthalung (พัทลุง) - 05:37 - three minute stop to change crews
 Bang Kaeo (บางแก้ว) - 06:07 
 Hat Yai (หาดใหญ่) - 07:31 - 15 minute stop for uncoupling from No. 45 (to Padang Besar), and refuelling 
 Chana (จะนะ) - 08:07
 Pattani (ปัตตานี) - 08:51
 Yala (ยะลา) - 09:28 - three minute stop to change crews
 Rue Sau (รือเสาะ) - 10:03
 Tanyong Mas (ตันหยงมัส) - 10:35
 Sugei Padi (สุไหงปาดี) - 11:02  
 Su-ngai Kolok (สุไหงโกลก) - 11:25 arrival

Train Number 38 Su-ngai Kolok - Bangkok (departure times) 
 Su-ngai Kolok (สุไหงโกลก) - 14:20  
 Sugei Padi (สุไหงปาดี) - 14:36  
 Tanyong Mas (ตันหยงมัส) - 15:03
 Rue Sau (รือเสาะ) - 15:34
 Yala (ยะลา) - 16:06 - three minute stop to change crews
 Pattani (ปัตตานี) - 16:37
 Hat Yai (หาดใหญ่) - 18:05 - 20 minute stop for attaching to No. 46 (from Padang Besar),and refuelling 
 Bang Kaeo (บางแก้ว) - 19:06
 Phatthalung (พัทลุง) - 19:34 - three minute stop to change crews 
 Thung Song (ทุ่งสง) - 21:19 - 15 minute stop for refuelling and changing crews 
 Surat Thani (สุราษฎร์ธานี) - 23:00 - three minute stop for changing crews 
 Chumphon (ชุมพร) - 01:36 (next day) - 10 minute stop for refuelling and changing crews 
 Bang Saphan Yai (บางสะพานใหญ่)- 03:08 
 Prachuap Khiri Khan (ประจวบคีรีขันธ์) - 04:17
 Hua Hin (หัวหิน) - 05:34  - three minute stop to change crews
 Ratchaburi (ราชบุรี) - 07:26
 Ban Pong (บ้านโป่ง) - 07:58
 Nakhon Pathom (นครปฐม) - 08:21
 Salaya (ศาลายา) - 09:05
 Bang Bumru (บางบำหรุ) - 09:32
 Bang Sue (บางซื่อ) - 09:54
 Sam Sen (สามเสน) - 10:05
 Bangkok (กรุงเทพ) - 10:30 arrival

Current status 
There are about 3-4 second class rakes (a set of coupled rail cars, normally coaches or wagons) plus one first class rake for the train between Hat Yai-Su-ngai Kolok. The Southern Special Express 37/38 has to be kept running as a means of reassuring residents that the central government will not abandon the local people of the three southern provinces despite the ongoing insurgencies there.

References 
 Schedule for Thaksin Special Express 37
 Schedule for Thaksin Special Express 38

External links
SRT southern route timetable

Passenger rail transport in Thailand
Night trains
Named passenger trains
Railway services introduced in 1922